The Barima River is a tributary of the Orinoco River, entering  from the Atlantic Ocean.

Features
Early recorded explorations of the Barima were made by Robert Hermann Schomburgk, which was mapped as far as the tributary Rocky River.

Near the Duquari Creek, the Arawatta Rock, a distinct large granite rock, is located.

Settlements
Mabaruma, Koriabo, and Morawhanna are Barima-Waini Region communities on the Barima River.

See also
Corocoro Island

References

Rivers of Guyana
Rivers of Venezuela
Orinoco basin
International rivers of South America